Albizia odoratissima, a member of the family Fabaceae, is a fast-growing, deciduous tree reaching  in height, a diameter of , and native to large parts of India (where it is known as கருவாகை, Kali siris or black siris), Bangladesh, Bhutan, Nepal, Myanmar, Laos, Thailand, Vietnam, Sri Lanka (where it is known as Ceylon rosewood) and China.
It is one of the top nitrogen-fixing trees.

It has become naturalised over large swathes of Tropical Africa, extending from Kenya down the east coast through Tanzania, Malawi and Zimbabwe as far south as Mozambique, and is grown in Johannesburg, South Africa. It has also become feral in Central America and Florida in the United States.

Albizia odoratissima has an attractive dark brown to black heartwood, often striped, durable and dense. It seasons with few problems, and works and polishes well, finding applications in structural timber, furniture and agricultural implements. In Bangladesh large areas of tea and coffee plantations are shaded by this species, while the foliage makes good cattle fodder. The species is liable to genetic degradation due to the 'extensive felling of phenotypically superior trees for commercial purposes.'

The fragrant flowers are white withering to a pale orange, appearing in large terminal clusters. The bark is dark grey with horizontal lenticels. Leaves are bipinnately compound, downy, with three to nine pairs of pinnae and ten to thirty pairs of pinnules. Seeds germinate readily with a high viability, but are often damaged by Bruchidius beetles of the family Chrysomelidae.

Gallery

References

External links
Prota4u

odoratissima
Plants described in 1782